Mummy, I'm a Zombie, also known under its working Spanish title Mamá, soy una zombi and later re-titled Dixie y la rebelión zombi, is a 2014 Spanish animated film and the sequel to the 2011 film Daddy, I'm a Zombie. It was directed by Ricardo Ramón and Beñat Beitia, and actress Kimberly Wharton returned to voice the main character of Dixie Grim in its English dub. The original film was released in three of the four official languages in Spain: Catalan, Basque, and Spanish.

Synopsis
Following the events of the prior movie Dixie is still trying to live a normal life after the divorce of her parents, particularly as her mother is keen on excluding her father from an upcoming Halloween party. Her mother is also pressuring her to stick with one type of social group rather than choosing her friends freely. Dixie also has to contend with lingering feelings for her former crush Ray and stress over an impending election for class president. In the midst of all of this Dixie is struck down with appendicitis and when she goes under anesthesia she once again finds herself in the world of the dead.

She is reunited with her friends Isis and Gonner, who want her to restore the powers of the magical amulet Azoth. Nebulosa has returned to wreak havoc and there is now also a group of zombie-hunting boys out to destroy all zombies as the undead can now travel freely between the two worlds. Meanwhile, unbeknownst to Dixie, Alyssa and Melissa are setting her up so they can ditch her and no one will be able to stand her afterward. To win more votes for class president, Dixie decides to throw a Halloween party and invite the whole class, but Melissa and Alyssa won't let her. Dixie becomes more stressed about her situation, and as her stress grows, she decides she needs to find the essence of the Azoth with Gonner and Isis to restore all good to the world. The search to revive the Azoth's powers is a costly one that results in the destruction of many of Dixie's undead friends. She is also forced to reveal that she is a zombie. Dixie faces off against Nebulosa using the powers of the Azoth, but is knocked to the ground. Nebulosa's gloating over the victory is short lived, as her attack angers the zombies and with their combined forces, defeat her. The living and the dead also form a tentative peace, as many happily reunite with their deceased loved ones.

Dixie wakes in her hospital bed, her appendix removed. She happily takes the removed organ and holds her Halloween party, which is wildly successful. Melissa and Alyssa also join the party, unable to stay away. The film ends with Dixie opening a window and looking out at the Halloween night. As she wishes that her friends were there with her, she hears their laughter as the wind blows in Gonner's eyepatch and Isis's headpiece.

Voice actors

Spanish release

 Paula Ribó as Dixie Malasombra
 Ivan Labanda as Gonner, Ernie
 Núria Trifol as Isis
 Elisabeth Bergalló as Piroska
 Luis Posada as Ricardo Malasombra, Vitriol
 Roser Batalla as Nigreda, Sofía Malasombra
 Francesc Belda as Thorko
 Albert Mieza as Fizcko
 Clara Schwarze as Liliana
 Manuel Osto as History Professor

English release

 Kimberly Wharton as Dixie Grim
 MJ Lallo as Gonner, Ernie, Julia
 Ratana as Isis
 Katie Leigh as Piroska, Miss Peachfeather
 Karen McCarthy as Nebulosa
 Danny Katiana as Tarizko, Thorko, Enfermero
 Mark Allen Jr. as Wires, Marbles
 Bobby Thong as Cricket, Brack
 Doug Gochman as Phil Grim, Vitriol, Ray
 Jennifer Wydra as Sophia
 Heather Downey as Allyssa
 Tracy Charles as Melissa   
 Josh Snyder as History Teacher

Reception
El Correo gave the film a positive review and favorably compared it to popular animation companies and directors such as Walt Disney, Hayao Miyazaki, and DreamWorks. In contrast, Time Out Barcelona rated the film at only two stars and criticized it as being overly dull and lacking the nerve and structure of its predecessor.  Guia del Ocio compared the film favorably against Tim Burton's films The Nightmare Before Christmas and Corpse Bride.

20 Minutes noted the film as a sequel to Dad, I'm a Zombie, with a return of the first film's directors and voice cast.

Close-UpFilm generally praised the film and wrote it was "a good watch but can be a tad dreary at times and doesn't quite deliver in terms of scares, even for a children's movie."

Release
The film premiered September 21, 2014 at San Sebastián International Film Festival, and screened October at Festival do Rio, as well as in November at Mar del Plata International Film Festival.

The project had a free children's premiere screenings November 1, 2014 in Madrid, Barcelona, Seville, Valencia, and Bilbao, with tickets awarded through participation in a contest, and followed November 7 with wide theatrical release across Spain.

References

External links
Official website, Dixie y la rebelión zombi (Spanish language)
Mummy, I'm a Zombie at the Internet Movie Database

2014 films
2014 computer-animated films
2010s adventure comedy films
2010s fantasy comedy films
Spanish animated films
2010s Spanish-language films
Spanish zombie films
Films about Halloween
2014 comedy films